Warta Zawiercie can refer to:

Warta Zawiercie (football)
Warta Zawiercie (volleyball)